Mackinlayoideae is a subfamily of plants containing about nine genera. In the APG II system it was treated at family rank as Mackinlayaceae, but since then it has been reclassified as a subfamily of Apiaceae.

Platysace, which has been placed in this subfamily, is sister to all the remaining Apiaceae genera according to a 2021 molecular phylogenetic study, so is excluded from the subfamily.

References

External links
 
 

 
Asterid subfamilies